Plesioserranus is an extinct genus of prehistoric bony fish that existed around 215 million years ago. The plesiosaurus, among many of its co-existers was a carnivore. Plesiosaurus was a plesiosaur, a type of marine reptile. It was not a dinosaur, though it coexisted with many dinosaurs. The first Plesiosaurus fossil was discovered in 1821. To this day 938 different specimens have been found by paleontologists.

Features 
The Plesioserranus would grow up to 43 feet long with long bodies, triangular heads and smooth sharp teeth. The Plesioserranus had up to 76 vertebrae in its neck, 10 times more than humans.

See also

 Prehistoric fish
 List of prehistoric bony fish

References

Prehistoric bony fish genera